Pseudomonas koreensis is a Gram-negative, non-spore-forming, motile, multiple polar flagellated, yellow-white, rod bacterium isolated from farming soil in Korea. The type strain is LMG 21318.

References

External links
Type strain of Pseudomonas koreensis at BacDive -  the Bacterial Diversity Metadatabase

Pseudomonadales
Bacteria described in 2003